William Franklin Graham III (born July 14, 1952) is an American evangelist and missionary. He frequently engages in Christian revival tours and political commentary. He is president and CEO of the Billy Graham Evangelistic Association (BGEA) and of Samaritan's Purse, an international Christian relief organization. Graham became a "committed Christian" in 1974 and was ordained in 1982, and has since become a public speaker and author. He is a son of the American evangelist Billy Graham.

Early life and education
William Franklin Graham III was born in Asheville, North Carolina, on July 14, 1952, to evangelist Billy Graham and Ruth Graham. He is the fourth of their five children. As a teenager, Graham attended The Stony Brook School, a Christian private school on Long Island, New York, but dropped out. He finished high school in North Carolina.

In 1970, Graham attended LeTourneau College in Longview, Texas, and was expelled from the school for keeping a female classmate out past curfew. In 1973, Graham joined Bob Pierce, founder of Samaritan's Purse, on a six-week mission to Asia. During this trip, Graham decided to focus on world relief. In 1974, he graduated from Montreat-Anderson College, now Montreat College, with an A.S. That same year on a trip to Jerusalem and he repented and experienced a new birth. In 1978 he graduated from Appalachian State University with a B.A.

He was ordained in 1982 by the Grace Community Church in Tempe, Arizona, a non-denominational church.

Ministry

In 1979, after the death of Pierce, he became the president of Samaritan's Purse.

In 1995, he became vice-president of the Billy Graham Evangelistic Association and became the CEO in 2000.

COVID vaccination 
Graham has said in interviews and social media posts that he believes Jesus would approve of the COVID-19 vaccine, saying "that's what Jesus Christ would want us to do, to help save life. It's just a tool to help save life." He has compared the vaccine to the oil and wine the Good Samaritan used to treat the wounds of the injured traveler, saying "Now the oil and wine were the medicines of that day." He told ABC News, "I think for a pastor to tell someone not to take the vaccine is problematic because what would happen if that person got coronavirus and died?"

Graham has also cited the work of Samaritan's Purse in describing his support for the vaccine. "We have seen what COVID can do," said Graham, citing Samaritan's Purse work to help during the outbreaks in Cremona, Italy; Los Angeles; North Carolina and the Bahamas.

Graham has also spoken of seeing the effects of the virus in his own organization. "I've had some of my own staff, one of them was on a ventilator for three months, Graham said in an interview with CBS News, "...from what I have seen and experienced myself, I don't want COVID and I don't want anybody else to get it." Graham stated that he and his wife are both vaccinated. He also stated, "I want people to know that COVID-19 can kill you. But we have a vaccine out there that could possibly save your life. And if you wait, it could be too late."

Controversies

Islam 
Graham came under criticism for comments he made about Islam in the wake of the September 11, 2001 attacks when he referred to Islam as "a very evil and wicked religion". Further criticism came on April 18, 2003, when he preached at a Good Friday service at the Pentagon. Graham has made controversial remarks against Islam saying "True Islam cannot be practiced in this country", to CNN's Campbell Brown in December 2009. "You can't beat your wife. You cannot murder your children if you think they've committed adultery or something like that, which they do practice in these other countries." On April 22, 2010, after objections from the Military Religious Freedom Foundation and the Muslim group Council on American–Islamic Relations (CAIR), the Pentagon rescinded his invitation from the Christian conservative National Day of Prayer Task Force to speak at a Pentagon National Day of Prayer event.

In September 2010, Graham stated on ABC's This Week with Christiane Amanpour that building churches and synagogues is forbidden in most countries in the Islamic world.

Two salaries 
Franklin Graham drew scrutiny in 2009 for drawing a full-time salary from Samaritan's Purse, while simultaneously receiving a full-time salary from Billy Graham Evangelistic Association (BGEA). This was called into question after his 2008 compensation from both organizations totaled $1.2 million. (Most of this was the result of a new IRS rule that required him to re-report deferred retirement contributions that had already been reported over the previous three years.) Some experts on non-profit organisations have questioned whether one person can perform two full-time jobs leading organizations that employ hundreds and spend hundreds of millions around the world. In response to the questions about his compensation, Graham decided to give up his salary from BGEA, stating his calling to the ministry "was never based on compensation". He also had contributions to his retirement plans suspended until the economy bounced back. However, Graham was again criticized in 2015 when it was revealed he had again taken up his salary from BGEA, and that his annual compensation was significantly higher than that of the CEO's of similar but much larger non-profit organisations 

According to 2014 data, Graham is the highest paid Samaritan's Purse employee at $622,252 annually and leads other charities in compensation. The preacher gave up a salary at the evangelistic association during the late economic downturn, but the leaders urged him to accept compensation again and he now receives increased retirement contributions as well as a regular salary. The evangelistic association reported 2013 revenues as $106.5 million and 2014 as $112,893,788.

Support of the Iraq War 
Graham supported the 2003 Invasion of Iraq.

In the August 30, 2010, issue of Time magazine, "Does America Hate Islam?", Graham reportedly said that Islam "is a religion of hatred. It's a religion of war." Building the cultural center near Ground Zero, he says, means Muslims "will claim now that the World Trade Center property ... is Islamic land."

Barack Obama (2009–2017) 
On August 19, 2010, when asked by CNN correspondent John King if he had doubts that President Barack Obama is a Christian, Graham stated, "I think the president's problem is that he was born a Muslim; his father was a Muslim. The seed of Islam is passed through the father like the seed of Judaism is passed through the mother. He was born a Muslim, his father gave him an Islamic name." Graham continued, "Now it's obvious that the president has renounced the prophet Mohammed, and he has renounced Islam, and he has accepted Jesus Christ. That's what he says he has done. I cannot say that he hasn't. So I just have to believe that the president is what he has said." In a March 2011 interview with the conservative Internet publication Newsmax, Graham claimed officials in the Obama administration had connections to the Muslim Brotherhood:
The Muslim Brotherhood is very strong and active in our country. It's infiltrated every level of our government. Right now we have many of these people that are advising the US military and State Department on how to respond in the Middle East, and it's like asking a fox, like a farmer asking a fox, "How do I protect my henhouse from foxes?" We've brought in Muslims to tell us how to make policy toward Muslim countries. And many of these people we've brought in, I'm afraid, are under the Muslim Brotherhood.

In an open letter response, Graham apologized to President Obama, saying, "I regret any comments I have ever made which may have cast any doubt on the personal faith of our president, Mr. Obama. The president has said he is a Christian and I accept that." In the open letter closing Graham stated, "In this election season and challenging economic time I am praying for our country and for those who lead it—for we are commanded in Scripture to do so."

Graham has commented on Hinduism as well, saying, "no elephant with 100 arms can do anything for me. None of their 9,000 gods is going to lead me to salvation".

Opposition to indicting Sudan's Al-Bashir 
When Sudanese president Omar Hassan al-Bashir was indicted by the International Criminal Court in March 2009, Graham argued in an op-ed in The New York Times that Bashir should not be indicted for alleged genocidal acts because the indictment would lead to the collapse of the 2005 peace agreement.

Donald Trump (2017–2021) 
In April 2011, Graham told ABC's This Week program that Donald Trump, who had recently declared an interest in the Republican nomination for the 2012 U.S. presidential race, was his preferred candidate. During an MSNBC Morning Joe interview on February 21, 2012, Graham said that Rick Santorum was most closely aligned to Christian values in his words and deeds and that Senator Santorum was certainly a Christian at heart. On President Obama, Graham said that he is "a fine man" but could not know whether the president was a Christian in his heart. Asked about Mitt Romney, Graham said that most Protestants do not view Mormonism as a Christian faith.

On February 28, 2012, Graham responded to a one-page letter sent by the National Association for the Advancement of Colored People (NAACP) as an: "Open Letter from Leaders of Faith Regarding Statements by Franklin Graham". In the introduction to the one-page letter, the fourteen signatories stated: "we are greatly troubled by recent attempts by some religious leaders to use faith as a political weapon. We were disturbed and disappointed by statements made by Rev. Franklin Graham during an interview on MSNBC that questioned whether President Obama is a Christian." In closing, the open-letter stated: "We call on Rev. Graham and all Christian leaders to exemplify this essential teaching of Jesus and refrain from using Christianity as a weapon of political division."
In June 2016, Graham told a crowd, "I have zero hope for the Democratic Party; I have no hope for the Republican Party. I am running a campaign to put God back in the political process." Nevertheless, in November 2016, Graham told The Washington Post that God had played a role in Donald Trump's election as U.S. president, saying: "I could sense going across the country that God was going to do something this year. And I believe that at this election, God showed up." The same newspaper noted that the day after Trump's victory, Graham had posted a comment on Facebook in which he wrote, "Did God show up? […] In watching the news after the election, the secular media kept asking 'How did this happen?' 'What went wrong?' 'How did we miss this?' Some are in shock. Political pundits are stunned. Many thought the Trump/Pence ticket didn't have a chance. None of them understand the God-factor." At the Inauguration of Donald Trump on January 20, 2017, Graham chose to read a passage from Paul's First Epistle to Timothy, chapter 2, which calls for prayers for all people, including "kings and for all those in authority, that we may live peacefully quiet lives in all godliness and holiness."

Since the 2016 election, Graham has "become known, above all, as the most vociferous evangelical ally" of Trump. He has strongly opposed the impeachment process, calling it an "unjust inquisition". In a November 21, 2019, interview with Eric Metaxas, Graham suggested opposition to Trump was the work of a "demonic power". In December, when Christianity Today magazine, founded by Graham's father Billy, published an editorial calling Trump "profoundly immoral" and supporting his removal from office, Graham responded by saying his father had voted for Trump and saw him as the "man for this hour in history for our nation" and that the magazine was "representing the elitist liberal wing of evangelicalism".

In mid-December 2020, Graham wrote about the Trump presidency on Facebook, saying that "President Trump will go down in history as one of the great presidents of our nation, bringing peace and prosperity to millions here in the U.S. and around the world."

In January 2021, Graham compared the ten Republican members of the House of Representatives who voted to impeach Trump to Judas Iscariot, suggesting that the Democrats had promised them "thirty pieces of silver".

Support for conversion therapy 
In 2017 Graham spoke against a bill proposing to ban conversion therapy. Referencing the biblical text of Leviticus 18:22, he said, "Homosexuality is defined by God as sin, an abomination to Him". He also compared conversion therapy to Conversion to Christianity.

North Carolina Amendment 1 
Graham supported North Carolina Amendment 1, which was passed by a voter referendum on May 8, 2012, prohibiting same-sex marriage and all domestic partnerships. Graham responded to Obama's May 9, 2012, statement of support for same-sex marriage, saying, "President Obama has, in my view, shaken his fist at the same God who created and defined marriage. It grieves me that our president would now affirm same-sex marriage, though I believe it grieves God even more."

In December 2017, several British MPs urged the Home Secretary to consider refusing UK entry to Graham from speaking at an event due to take place in Blackpool in September 2018. As Graham represents the evangelical community, critics argued that those who want to ban Graham which means that individuals who have different opinions of LGBT rights would be banned in the UK. Gordon Marsden, an openly gay Labour MP suggested that Graham's comments may have contravened British laws on hate speech. As of February 2018, a petition against Graham being granted a visa had gathered more than 7,500 signatures. The pastor of Liberty Church in Blackpool, who organized the petition, said: "As a Christian and as a leader of a church that particularly welcomes LGBT people, I'm horrified that other local churches are inviting someone with this record of hate speech." The pastor said that Graham's visit had triggered an "enormous amount of protest from Christians in the north-west" of England, and his presence would be "extremely destructive in the area".

Buttigieg tweets 
After South Bend, Indiana mayor Pete Buttigieg became the first openly gay man to announce a run for the 2020 Democratic nomination for President against President Donald Trump, Graham attacked Buttigieg for his homosexuality and marriage to another gay man in April 2019, tweeting "Mayor Buttigieg says he's a gay Christian. As a Christian I believe the Bible which defines homosexuality as sin, something to be repentant of, not something to be flaunted, praised or politicized. The Bible says marriage is between a man & a woman—not two men, not two women." The tweet was one of three in a thread.

The tweet was met with a strong negative response against Graham, much of which condemned Graham as a hypocrite for selective criticism of a Democratic candidate's perceived wrongdoings while remaining silent on those perceived of the incumbent Republican. MSNBC host Joe Scarborough denounced Graham on his Morning Joe program, saying, "Just shut up Franklin Graham! You are a disgrace! You are a disgrace for normalizing Donald Trump's behavior." The Washington Post columnist Jennifer Rubin rebuked Graham as a "hypocritical bigot" who "has rationalized Trump's infidelity and racism, ignored his lies, cheered his inhumane immigration policy and behaved as a political hack rather than a religious leader," also writing "Buttigieg gets the benefit of being attacked by a right-winger whom progressives revile, gets to underscore a message of generational change and acceptance and gets to demonstrate what a class act he is. The other candidates must be wondering why some GOP hatemonger doesn't attack them." Opinion pieces in the National Review, The Charlotte Observer, and The Arizona Republic were also critical of Graham's comments.

Praise of Vladimir Putin
Graham defended Russian President Vladimir Putin's "gay propaganda" law and has praised his leadership for "protecting children from any homosexual agenda or propaganda."

UK tour 2020 and 2022 
All venues booked for Franklin Graham's planned eight-city 2020 UK tour cancelled his booking after protests by LGBTQ+ activists, petitions and requests from local councils. Mayor of Liverpool, Joe Anderson, stated Liverpool is proud of its LGBT+ community and would challenge hatred and intolerance.  Graham's organisation said it would seek other venues.  Many opponents said statements Graham had made were incompatible with their values, and that his appearance would be divisive, could be disruptive or lead to a breach of the peace. After threatening legal action for breach of contract and giving assurances to venues that his preaching would not be discriminatory, Graham's tour was rescheduled for mid-2022.

Personal life
Graham married Jane Austin Cunningham of Smithfield, North Carolina, in 1974. They have four children: William Franklin Graham IV (Will), born in 1975, Roy Austin Graham (1977), Edward Bell Graham (1979) and Jane Austin Graham Lynch (Cissie) (1986). Graham and his wife have eleven grandchildren.

Graham underwent heart surgery in November 2021.

Published works
 Bob Pierce: This One Thing I Do (1983)
 Rebel With A Cause: Finally Comfortable Being Graham (1995), autobiography
 Miracle in a Shoe Box (1995)
 Living Beyond the Limits: A Life in Sync with God (1998)
 The Name (2002)
 Kids Praying for Kids (2003)
 All for Jesus (2003), with Ross Rhoads
 A Wing and a Prayer (2005)

References

External links 

 
 Official site of Franklin Graham Festivals 
 People magazine – timeline history
 Religionnews.com 
 Samaritan's Purse

1952 births
Living people
20th-century Baptists
21st-century American male writers
21st-century American non-fiction writers
21st-century Baptists
American anti-abortion activists
American critics of Islam
American evangelicals
American evangelists
American humanitarians
American male non-fiction writers
American anti-same-sex-marriage activists
Anti-LGBT sentiment
Appalachian State University alumni
Baptists from New York (state)
Baptists from North Carolina
Baptist writers
Christian critics of Islam
Conservatism in the United States
Editors of Christian publications
Graham family
LeTourneau University alumni
Montreat College alumni
North Carolina Independents
North Carolina Republicans
People from Boone, North Carolina
Southern Baptists
The Stony Brook School alumni
Writers from Asheville, North Carolina